Alternative Light Source is the third album by the English electronic group Leftfield, released on 8 June 2015. It is the first new material following the band's 1999 album Rhythm and Stealth. It is also the first Leftfield album without Paul Daley, as well as the first since the band's return in 2010.

On 1 June 2015, the album premiere was streamed live on Twitter, coupled with conversation via hashtag #leftfieldstream.

Track listing
 "Bad Radio" (featuring Tunde Adebimpe) – 5:22
 "Universal Everything" (featuring Georgia Barnes) – 7:06
 "Bilocation" (featuring Channy Leaneagh of Poliça) – 4:24
 "Head and Shoulders" (featuring Sleaford Mods) – 5:24
 "Dark Matters" – 5:02
 "Little Fish" (featuring Channy Leaneagh of Poliça) – 6:08
 "Storms End" – 5:00
 "Alternative Light Source" – 3:16
 "Shaker Obsession" – 5:22
 "Levitate for You" (featuring Ofei) – 5:14

Charts

References

2015 albums
Leftfield albums
Infectious Music albums